John Gerrard Flynn  (born 23 April 1937) is a former British Foreign Office diplomat.

He joined the Foreign Office in 1965 and was sent to Lusaka the following year.

He also served in the following positions:
 Assistant Director, Canning House (1970)
 Montevideo, Uruguay, Head of Chancery (1971)
 Luanda, Angola, Chargé d'affaires (1978)
 Brasilia, Brazil, Counsellor (political; 1979)
 Madrid, Spain, Counsellor (economic and commercial; 1982)
 Swaziland, High Commissioner (1987–90)
 Ambassador to Angola (1990–93)
 Ambassador to Venezuela (1993–97; concurrently served as non-resident ambassador to the Dominican Republic, 1993–95)
 Foreign Secretary's special representative to Sierra Leone, (1998–present)

Honours
Flynn was named Companion of the Order of St Michael and St George in 1992.

External links
 Biodata from Debrett's

1937 births
Living people
Ambassadors of the United Kingdom to Venezuela
Ambassadors of the United Kingdom to Angola
Ambassadors of the United Kingdom to the Dominican Republic
Ambassadors of the United Kingdom to Haiti
High Commissioners of the United Kingdom to Eswatini
British people of Irish descent
Companions of the Order of St Michael and St George